Policewomen is a 1974 exploitation film about a female police officer who infiltrates an all-female criminal gang. The film was written and directed by Lee Frost, and stars Sondra Currie (who would later be better known to recent audiences for her role in the Golden Globe-winning comedy The Hangover), Tony Young, and Phil Hoover.

Despite the fact that the story actually features only one female police officer, the film's title was pluralized and formed into one word because the title Police Woman was already in use by an NBC TV series whose pilot was scheduled to premiere one month after this film's release.

Plot
A lady cop infiltrates an all-female criminal gang.

Cast 
Sondra Currie as Lacy Bond
Tony Young as Lt. Frank Mitchell
Phil Hoover as Doc
Elizabeth Stuart as Maude
Jean Bell as Pam Harris
Laurie Rose as Janette
William Smith as Karate Teacher
Richard Schuyler as Pete Peterson
Eileen Saki as Kim 
Wes Bishop as Raymond
Susie Ewing as Laura (as Susan McIver)
Steven Stewart as Fenwick
Dorrie Thomson as Caroline
Jody Daniels as Policeman (as Jody Daniel)
Lee Frost as Catalina Attendant

See also
 List of American films of 1974

External links
 

1974 films
Crown International Pictures films
American crime action films
American martial arts films
1970s exploitation films
American police detective films
Films directed by Lee Frost
1974 martial arts films
1970s crime action films
1970s gang films
1970s English-language films
1970s American films